Nils Mortimer Moreno (born 11 June 2001) is a Spanish professional footballer who plays as a winger for Danish Superliga club Viborg FF. He is a former Spanish youth international.

Career

Barcelona
Born in Málaga, Mortimer began his career at UD La Mosca as a four-year old. Instead of getting picked up by Málaga CF, he was discovered by Sevilla and spent one year making the two-and-a-half-hour trip between the two cities. The distance would prove to be too demanding for the youngster, and he joined Málaga's youth academy. In 2013, he joined the famous Barcelona youth academy where he worked his way through the youth ranks, winning the UEFA Youth League with the Juveniles A in 2018.

Mortimer made his debut for the club's reserve team, Barcelona B, on 24 March 2019 in a 1–0 win at Ebro under head coach García Pimienta, and began receiving regular call-ups for the team during the 2019–20 season. He was officially promoted to the B team in June 2020, signing a three-year contract, with his buyout clause set to €50 million which would rise to €100 million if he were to be promoted to the first team. He made a total of 39 appearances for Barça B, scoring three goals in four seasons as part of the team. He was released from his contract on 7 July 2022, making him a free agent.

Viborg
On 7 July 2022, the same day as he was released by Barcelona B, Mortimer joined Danish Superliga club Viborg FF on a four-year contract. He made his debut for Viborg on 24 July in a 3–1 away loss to AGF, coming on in the 83rd minute in place of Jay-Roy Grot. His first Viborg goal came on 9 August, opening the score in a 2–1 away win over Faroese club B36 Tórshavn in the UEFA Europa Conference League third qualifying round.

Career statistics

Club

References

External links
 Profile at Viborg FF
 
 
 
 

2001 births
Living people
Spanish footballers
Spain youth international footballers
Association football forwards
Danish Superliga players
Expatriate men's footballers in Denmark
FC Barcelona Atlètic players
Footballers from Málaga
Primera Federación players
Segunda División B players
Spanish expatriate sportspeople in Denmark
Spanish expatriate footballers
Viborg FF players